Russell Kean (born 25 March 1951) is a New Zealand cricketer. He played in seven first-class matches for Wellington from 1976 to 1978.

See also
 List of Wellington representative cricketers

References

External links
 

1951 births
Living people
New Zealand cricketers
Wellington cricketers
Cricketers from Wellington City